"Every Little Thing" is a 1991 song by Australian singer Kate Ceberano. It was released as the first single from her studio album, Think About It! (1991). It was released in July 1991 on the Festival Records label and spent nine weeks in the top 50 and peaked at No.34 on the Australian singles charts.

Track listing
 CD Single
 "Every Little Thing"  - 3:47
 "Losing You" -

 The Remixes
 "Every Little Thing" (7" Mix) - 3:49
 "Every Little Thing" (Wicked Thing Mix)	- 5:20
 "Every Little Thing" (The Essence Mix) - 5:49

Charts

Weekly Charts

References 

Kate Ceberano songs
1991 songs
1991 singles
Festival Records singles